Kuntur Muyunan (Quechua kuntur condor, muyuy to move circularly, -na, -n suffixes, 'where the condor flies around in circles', also spelled Cóndor Muyunan) is a mountain in the Andes of Peru which reaches a height of approximately . It is located in the Junín Region, Chanchamayo Province, Chanchamayo District. Kuntur Muyunan lies north of a lake named Hatunqucha (Quechua for "big lake").

References 

Mountains of Peru
Mountains of Junín Region